Fritz Scheider was a German water polo player. He competed in the men's tournament at the 1900 Summer Olympics.

References

External links
 

Year of birth missing
Year of death missing
German male water polo players
Olympic water polo players of Germany
Water polo players at the 1900 Summer Olympics
Place of birth missing
Place of death missing